Mom's Got Game is an American reality television that debuted January 18, 2014, on the Oprah Winfrey Network.

Premise
Mom's Got Game chronicles the lives of former WNBA basketball star Pamela McGee and her son, NBA player, JaVale McGee. The series also encompasses Pam as she manages her son's career, while also building her own brand.

Episodes

References

External links
 

2010s American reality television series
2014 American television series debuts
2014 American television series endings
English-language television shows
Oprah Winfrey Network original programming
Television series by Sony Pictures Television